Drupa (Ricinella) rubusidaeus, common name : the strawberry drupe, is a species of sea snail, a marine gastropod mollusk in the family Muricidae, the murex snails or rock snails.

Description
The shell size varies between 20 mm and 60 mm

Distribution
This species is distributed in the Red Sea and in the Indian Ocean along Aldabra, Chagos, the Mascarene Basin, Mauritius and Tanzania and in the Indo-West Pacific.

References

 Spry, J.F. (1961). The sea shells of Dar es Salaam: Gastropods. Tanganyika Notes and Records 56

External links
 

rubusidaeus
Gastropods described in 1798